The Elang Hitam is an unmanned aerial vehicle (UAV) being developed by PT Dirgantara Indonesia (IAe) in cooperation with a consortium of five other institutions. This drone was first shown in December 30, 2019 at the PTDI hangar, Bandung, West Java.

The EH is the result of collaboration in the formation of a consortium between the Agency for the Assessment and Application of Technology (BPPT), Ministry of Defense, Indonesian Air Force, ITB, PT Dirgantara Indonesia, and PT LEN Persero.

Development history 
According to PT DI and BPPT, the development of a MALE UCAV has been initiated by the Ministry of Defense's R&D since 2015 involving the TNI, Ditjen Pothan Kemhan, Ministry of Defense, BPPT, ITB, and PT Dirgantara Indonesia (Persero). This was marked by creating a design agreement, drafting the requirements and objectives (DR&O) and determining the user, in this case it would be the TNI, especially the TNI-AU. Plans were made to introduce it as a UAV in 2022 before it would be further developed as a UCAV in 2024.

The development started with preliminary design, basic design by making two wind tunnel models and the conclusion of test results in 2016 and 2018. In 2019, LAPAN entered as a member of the consortium, and took part in the development of the MALE UCAV. 

The first prototype was rolled out on 30 December 2019 in the PTDI hangar. First flight is expected to take place at the end of 2020. The Elang Hitam, according to its development plan, will be armed with missiles and capable of flying up to 30 hours non-stop with a cruising altitude of up to 23,000 ft. The specification is said to match the Chinese-made CH-4 Rainbow drone.

Due to the Covid-19 pandemic, the first flight which was originally scheduled to fly for the first time in 2020 has been postponed to late 2021.

On July 17, 2022, Indonesia announced a collaboration with Turkey to manufacture air-to-surface missiles that can be easily mounted on UAVs. However, further development on the EH was suspended as of September 15, 2022.

Specifications

References 

Unmanned aerial vehicles of Indonesia
Single-engined pusher aircraft
Single-engine aircraft